The xun lei chong is a revolving-barrel, spear-combined musket invented by Zhao Shizhen (趙士禎) during the Ming dynasty (1368-1644).

For Zhao Shi-Zhen's radical design, he connected five thin gun barrels behind a reinforced shield: like the five thunder divine machine the gunner could rotate the fuse 72 degrees and swiftly light each barrel with his match. These weapons would serve as defensive weapons and be fired from walls or high positions like hillocks and ridges. They were recorded to be deadly at 120 paces.

The central firing device is actually a combination of a detachable spear plus five tubings plus a firing mechanism, fitted together with interlocking grooves. The shield could be pulled off from the front and slung on the hand, the gun's rest is actually a double sided hand axe.

References

Muskets
Combination weapons
Multiple-barrel firearms
Firearms of China